Anthony D. Salzman is an American businessman. He helped setup the American Chamber of Commerce in Hanoi, Vietnam, advocated for lifting the U.S. trade Embargo against Vietnam (1994), the U.S.-Vietnam Bilateral Trade Agreement that was signed in 2001, and contributed to Vietnam's integration into global intellectual property treaties in 2004. Salzman also established the first American company in Hanoi and was a member of the founding Board of Trustees of The United Nations School of Hanoi (“UNIS”). Salzman is also the President of the Ida C. and Morris Falk Foundation.

Awards
In 2010, Salzman was awarded "The Friendship Medal" by President Nguyen Minh Triet for his work dismantling the trade embargo and promoting the Bilateral Trade Agreement between the US and Vietnam, and was also awarded the "Capital Development Medal" for contributions to the economic progress of Hanoi city.

Education
Salzman earned a BA from Yale University and JD from Duke Law School.

References

21st-century American businesspeople
Living people
Year of birth missing (living people)
Yale University alumni
Duke University School of Law alumni